The Walhalla Glades Trail is a hiking trail located on the North Rim of the Grand Canyon in Grand Canyon National Park in the U.S. state of Arizona.

The Walhalla Glades area contains Ancestral Puebloan (Anasazi) affiliated archaeological sites dating from between A.D. 1050 to A.D. 1150.

See also
 List of trails in Grand Canyon National Park

References

Grand Canyon, North Rim
Grand Canyon, Walhalla Plateau
Hiking trails in Grand Canyon National Park